Clowes is a surname. Notable people with the surname include:

 Caroline Morgan Clowes (1838–1904), American painter
 Cyril Clowes (1892–1968), Australian soldier
 Daniel Clowes (born 1961), Alternative cartoonist and screenwriter
 Hannah Clowes (born 1991), English gymnast
 Henry Clowes (1863–1899), English cricketer
 John Clowes (footballer) (born 1929), English footballer 
 John Clowes (priest) (1743–1831), English Anglican cleric and Swedenborgian
 Nick Laird-Clowes (born 1957), English musician and composer
 Ronald M. Clowes, Canadian geophysicist
 Samuel Clowes (Conservative politician) (1821–1898), English Conservative politician, MP for North Leicestershire 1868–1880
 Samuel Clowes (Labour politician) (1864–1928), English Labour politician, MP for Hnaley 1924–1928
 Sue Clowes, English designer 
 Thomas Clowes (1791–1866), New York politician
 Waliyato Clowes, Papua New Guinean politician
 William Clowes (Primitive Methodist) (1780–1851), one of the founders of Primitive Methodism
 William Clowes (printer) (1779–1847), printer who established William Clowes Ltd.
 William Laird Clowes (1856–1905), British journalist and historian
 William Clowes (surgeon) (1540–1604), English surgeon and author

See also
 Clow (disambiguation)
 Cowes